Pankaj Kumar is an Indian cinematographer. He is known for his work on films like Haider, Tumbbad and Ship of Theseus among others. He won the Filmfare Award for Best Cinematography for Tumbbad in 2019.

Early life
He was educated at the Film and Television Institute of India.

He completed his schooling from Kendriya Vidyalaya, Hakimpet, Secunderabad in 1993.

Early career
He made his debut with the Ship of Theseus (2012) and subsequently with Haider (2014), Talvar (2015), and Rangoon (2017).

Filmography 
 As a cinematographer

Awards and nominations

Filmfare Awards

Screen Awards

Other awards

References

External links 
 
 

Indian cinematographers
Film and Television Institute of India alumni